Burmesarchaea is a diverse extinct genus of spiders, placed in the family Archaeidae. The type species Burmesarchaea grimaldii was first described in 2003 and least 13 more species have been assigned to the genus. The genus has been exclusively found in Cretaceous Burmese amber, which is dated to 99 million years ago.

Description
Burmesarchaea grimaldii is only known from a single male specimen preserved in amber. It is a small spider, with a body length of just under . Characteristic of the family Archaeidae, the head region is raised up from the thorax, although without the distinctive "neck" found in other genera in the family. It is presumed to have eight eyes (the posterior median eye is not visible); the anterior median eye is the largest. All the legs are without spines. The pedipalp has a large, rounded bulb with a spoon-shaped embolus and bent tegular apophysis.

Taxonomy
A fossil spider, the type species holotype from Burmese amber, was first described by David Penny in 2003 as Afrarchaea grimaldii. The species name grimaldii honours David Grimaldi of the American Museum of Natural History for his contributions to the study of amber and for assistance with the specimen. In 2008, J. Wunderlich transferred A. grimaldii and  Lacunauchenius speciosus to his newly erected genus, Burmesarchaea.

Species
B. alissa Wunderlich, 2017
B. caudata Wunderlich, 2017
B. crassicaput Wunderlich, 2017
B. crassichelae Wunderlich, 2017
B. gibber Wunderlich, 2017
B. gibberoides Wunderlich, 2017
B. gibbosa Wunderlich, 2017
B. grimaldii (Penney, 2003)
B. longicollum Wunderlich, 2017
B. propinqua Wunderlich, 2017
B. pseudogibber Wunderlich, 2017
B. pustulata Wunderlich, 2017
B. quadrata Wunderlich, 2017
B. speciosa (Wunderlich, 2008)

References

Archaeidae
Extinct arachnids
Araneomorphae genera
Burmese amber
Fossils of Myanmar
Fossil taxa described in 2003
Spiders of Asia